Julia Scheib (born 12 May 1998) is an Austrian alpine skier.

Career
During her career she has achieved four results among the top 15 in the FIS Alpine Ski World Cup.

World Cup results
Top 15

References

External links
 
 
 

1998 births
Living people
Austrian female alpine skiers